Hussain Nizam Shah I (1553–1565) was the preeminent ruler of the Ahmadnagar Sultanate and the leading figure of the coalition of the Deccan Sultanates during the Battle of Talikota. Notably, Hussain Nizam Shah was responsible for taking prisoner and beheading Rama Raya of Vijayanagara after the Battle of Talikota.

Family

Wives
Daulat Shah Begum, daughter of Darya Imad Shah;
Khunza Humayun, a great-great-granddaughter of Sultan Jahan Shah of the Qara Qoyunlu;

Issue
By Khunza Humayun:
Murtaza Nizam Shah I, Sultan of Ahmednagar;
Burhan Nizam Shah II, Sultan of Ahmednagar;
Chand Bibi, married Sultan Ali Adil Shah I of Bijapur. Later became regent of Bijapur and Ahmednagar successively;
Bibi Khadija, married Jamal-ud-din Hansan Auju;

By Surya:
Bibi Jamila, married Sultan Ibrahim Qutb Shah of Golconda;
Shah Qasim;
Shah Mansur;
Aqa Bibi, married Mir Abdul Wahhab, son of Sayyid Abdul Azum;

See also
Deccan Sultanates 
Ahmadnagar Sultanate

References

Sultans
16th-century Indian monarchs
16th-century Indian Muslims
People from Gujarat
Gujarati people